This list of mountains and hills in the Harz contains a selection of mountains, hills, high points and their outliers in the Harz Mountains of Germany. The Harz is part of the German Central Uplands and a natural region main unit (number D37) in the states of Lower Saxony, Saxony-Anhalt and Thuringia. The list includes the mountains and hills of the Harz National Park and the nature parks of Harz (Lower Saxony), Harz/Saxony-Anhalt and the South Harz. Hills in the South Harz Karst Landscape Biosphere Reserve, the Harz regions of Alter Stolberg, Mansfeld Land, Ramberg and Rüdigsdorf Switzerland are also included.

→ see also: Harzklippen for a list of rock formations, including tors and crags.

The table is sorted by elevations in metres above sea level referred to Normalnull (NN), except where indicated, according to the BfN). Several columns in the table are sortable by clicking on the symbols in the header. In the column “Mountain, hills, high point”, alternative names are given in brackets and in small, italicized text. In these columns, where the same name occurs more than once, it is distinguished by location names in small text in brackets.

A key to the abbreviations used in the table is given below.

Mountains and hills of unknown elevation 
These are mountains and hills whose elevations are not known/yet researched:

Height unknown 
These are mountains and hills whose height is unknown or not yet researched:

Abbreviations 
The meanings of abbreviations found in the table are given below:

Counties (using county number plate letters):
 GS = Goslar (Lower Saxony)
 HZ = Harz (Saxony-Anhalt)
 MSH = Mansfeld-Südharz (Saxony-Anhalt)
 OHA = Osterode am Harz (Lower Saxony)
 NMH = Nordhausen (Thuringia)

Unincorporated areas (UA):
 UA-GS = Harz UA in Goslar county
 UA-OHA = Harz UA in Osterode am Harz county

German states:
 LS = Lower Saxony
 S-A = Saxony-Anhalt
 TH = Thuringia

Countries:
 FRG = Federal Republic of Germany
 GDR = German Democratic Republic
 USSR = Union of Soviet Socialist Republics

National parks
 Harz NLP = Harz National Park

Nature parks:
 Harz NRP (LS) = Harz Nature Park (Lower Saxony)
 Harz/S-A NRP = Harz/Saxony-Anhalt Nature Park
 South Harz NRP = South Harz Nature Park

Special:

 B = Bundesstraße i.e. federal road
 BNM = Bundesnachrichtendienst, the Federal German Intelligence Service
 BR = biosphere reserve
 BW = Bundeswehr (FRG)
 CD = cultural monument
 E = East[ern]
 Ex = former
 Gr = Große, Großer i.e. Great
 GRU = Glawnoje Raswedywatelnoje Uprawlenije (USSR)
 FRB = Flood retention basin
 HS = hydropower station
 IC = United States Intelligence Community
 Kl = Kleine, Kleiner i.e. Small
 L = Landesstraße i.e. state road
 Mansfeld L. = Mansfeld Land
 MfS = Ministerium für Staatssicherheit (i.e. the Stasi; GDR)
 Mon = monument
 N = north[ern]
 NM = natural monument
 NLP = national park
 NNE = North-northeast[ern]
 NRP = Nature park
 NR = nature reserve
 OP = observation platform / viewing point
 OT = observation tower
 PSF = Pumped storage facility
 Rüdigsdorf S. = Rüdigsdorf Switzerland
 S = Source (river)
 S = South[ern]
 s. a. = see also
 UA = unincorporated area
 WT = water tower
 YH = youth hostel

See also 
 List of rock formations in the Harz
 List of the highest mountains in Germany
 List of the highest mountains in the German states
 List of mountain and hill ranges in Germany
 List of mountains and hills of Thuringia
 List of mountains and hills in Saxony-Anhalt
 List of mountains and hills in Lower Saxony

References 

!
!
!
!
Harz